Aviation accidents and incidents, particularly civilian airplane crashes or incidents threatening a crash or requiring an emergency landing, are a common theme in fiction. Films centered on such incidents make up a substantial subset of the disaster film genre, and influence how other stories within the genre are told. Works in this genre encompass both fictional depictions of the incidents themselves, and depictions of consequences such as investigations, lawsuits, and the effect on the lives of persons involved. A subgenre, the "plane crash survival movie", involves characters placed in a dangerous environment by an initial airplane crash. Airplane crashes have been described as "the easy and obvious device" for dramatically incorporating an airplane into the plot of a film, and as "a Hollywood staple", with various levels of praise or criticism directed to the realism of specific depictions.

Development of the genre
A review of the genre by The Guardian following the release of the film, Sully, found that film to be "simply the next logical step in the long line of movies portraying with ever greater grim authenticity the waking nightmare of a plane going down". The Guardian noted that "in the age of mass air travel, the plane crash is one of the last great levellers", where everyone is equally at risk regardless of social status, but also found that "the thing about plane-crash movies is they come with happy endings, or at least the promise of one", and that the message is often "have faith in pilots". Notably, in some instances controversies have arisen from the release of films involving air crashes in proximity to unpredictably timed real-life air crashes.  Another review assessing the 2012 film, Flight, also centered on a fictional airplane crash, stated that "when it comes to planes and pilots, Hollywood never gets it right", noting that contrary to some fictional accounts, pilots are almost never inebriated, and co-pilots are equally as qualified and capable as the assigned pilot for the flight.

Origins
Early films involving aircraft tended to focus on military air battles, or professional stunt flying activities, rather than depictions of civilian air incidents. An early example of the latter is seen in the events of the 1954 novel, Lord of the Flies, which was precipitated by a group of boys being marooned on an island in a plane crash. Harold Bloom writes that "[t]hrough the boys' dialogue... we learn that these boys and others were in a plane crash. The nose of the plane went down in flames, but the cabin crashed through the jungle trees, landing near enough to water to be pulled out to sea, perhaps with some boys still aboard". Bloom notes that the account provided has been deemed implausible by critics, as the story describes the child characters as having survived with no injuries, while leaving no adult survivors, and with the crash leaving a "long scar" in the jungle, but with no debris from the airplane.

Also in 1954, John Wayne starred in the film, The High and the Mighty, in which a veteran airline first officer, flying as a passenger on an airplane that has a catastrophic engine failure while crossing the Pacific Ocean, must help fly the plane to a safe landing. The High and the Mighty was one of the first films centered on a potential air disaster. This was shortly followed by Flight into Danger, a 1956 Canadian live television play written by Arthur Hailey and starring James Doohan, depicting the pilots at the controls of a Canadair North Star, a large commercial airliner, falling victim to food poisoning, leaving it to an ex-Second World War Spitfire fighter pilot among the passengers, to take over and safely land the unfamiliar aircraft. Hailey, a former British pilot in the Second World War, wrote the teleplay in only nine days and shopped it about as a screenplay. The Canadian Broadcasting Corporation, barely four years old, bought the script for $600.

Influence of Flight into Danger
When Flight into Danger was broadcast live-to-air on April 3, 1956, on the network's General Motors Theatre, it was seen by two million people and received a resounding positive reaction. "In the words of one journalist, it was 'probably the most successful TV play ever written anywhere'." A kinescope of the live production was broadcast in August 1956 due to viewer demand.

In 1957, Flight into Danger was adapted into the feature film Zero Hour! and, in 1962, the story was adapted for an episode of the BBC series Studio 4. In 1964, a German version of the television film was produced under the title Flug in Gefahr. Czechoslovak radio (Československý rozhlas) has produced it as part of the radio series Let do nebezpečí, directed by Jiří Horčička. An Australian television version was produced in 1966. In Flight into Danger, Hailey created the template for future disaster films: character-driven plot lines built up among diverse characters would dominate, with brief episodes or flashbacks giving back stories, and all the individual stories coming together at the climax. Hailey and John Castle novelized the story as Runway Zero-Eight (1958), which was dramatized in 1971 as Terror in the Sky, a Movie of the Week. The story elements were more famously parodied in the 1980 comedy Airplane!.

Additional aviation-themed precursors to the popular disaster films of the 1970s included Jet Storm and Jet Over the Atlantic, two 1959 films both featuring attempts to blow up an airplane in mid-flight; The Crowded Sky (1960) which depicts a mid-air collision; and The Doomsday Flight (1966), written by Rod Serling and starring Edmond O'Brien as a disgruntled aerospace engineer who plants a barometric pressure bomb on an airliner built by his former employer set to explode when the airliner descends for landing.

Influence of the Airport novel and film series
Flight into Danger author Arthur Hailey also penned the 1968 novel Airport, which was adapted into the first of a series of films in the genre. The novel was poorly reviewed, with Mark Levin of The New York Times saying, "Mr. Hailey is a plodding sort of writer, but he has just the talent to suggest the crashing ennui of airport routine, where only a mortal disaster can provide color". In the same newspaper, Eliot Fremont-Smith wrote, "As for the formula, the possibilities seem all but inexhaustible. With 'Hotel' and 'Airport' successfully absorbed, can 'Shopping Center,' 'Parking Lot' and 'City Dump' be far behind?"  Still, the book was commercially successful among readers. It spent 64 weeks on the New York Times best seller list, 30 of which were at #1, and became the biggest-selling novel of 1968. George Seaton wrote and directed the film adaptation, which was released by Universal in 1970, whittling down the subplots of the novel to focus on the air disaster, the need to land a bomb-damaged plane at a snow-hampered airport. With an all-star cast, the film was nominated for ten Academy Awards, including Best Picture. It earned $100.5 million at the domestic box office (the equivalent of $ million in ). Its success, combined with that of 1972's The Poseidon Adventure (set on a sinking ship), led to the proliferation of disaster movies of the 1970s.

Airport itself spawned the sequels, Airport 1975 (1974), Airport '77 (1977), and The Concorde ... Airport '79 (1979). In 1980, the highly successful parody film Airplane! was released, drawing on elements of Zero Hour! and the Airport film series. This was itself followed by a sequel, Airplane II: The Sequel, in 1982.

Directors have gone to great lengths to make plane crash scenes appear realistic. For example, for a scene in the 2020 film Tenet, in which a taxiing airplane is driven into a building (though without leaving the ground), the production demolished an actual airplane.

Plane crash survival subgenre
A review of the 2017 film The Mountain Between Us, which begins with a plane crash in remote mountains, notes the existence of the subgenre, the "plane crash survival movie". This subgenre involves characters placed in a dangerous environment—typically in frozen mountainous terrain—by an initial airplane crash. Films within this genre include Alive (1993), The Edge (1997), Cast Away (2000), The Snow Walker (2003), and The Grey (2010).

Notable examples

Film
Airport (1970): written and directed by George Seaton, focuses on a bomb-damaged plane attempting to reach and land at a snow-hampered Chicago airport.
Airport 1975 (also known as Airport '75; 1974): American air disaster film and the first sequel to the successful 1970 film Airport. It was directed by Jack Smight, produced by William Frye and Jennings Lang, and written by Don Ingalls. It concerns the dramatic events aboard an airborne Boeing 747 when a small aircraft crashes into the cockpit, causing the fatalities of senior crew and the blinding of the pilot, leaving with no one aboard qualified to take the controls. It featured an improbable scene in which a new pilot was brought to the plane by helicopter, to be lowered in through the hole in the cockpit.
 Airplane! (1980): genre parody in which the flight crew becomes ill due to food poisoning, and a former fighter pilot now suffering from a fear of flying is forced to land the plane.
 Alive (1993): the true story of members of a Uruguayan soccer team who survive the crash of a Fairchild Hiller FH-227D operating as Uruguayan Air Force (Fuerza Aérea Uruguaya) Flight 571 T-571 in the Andean mountains, and had to find a way to stay alive until rescue. Industrial Light & Magic depicted the crash using an eight-foot breakaway model, designed to shear at mid-fuselage. The nose and tail were heavily reinforced while a non-reinforced midsection was built up of plastic, foil, wires and metals so that when it broke it would have the layered metal look of a real airframe breaking up. A cable system was rigged to fly the model, which was on an aligned track, into the miniature mountain, hitting the "sweet spot" on the fuselage, a weakened area barely three inches long.
 The Aviator (2004): Leonardo DiCaprio stars in a biopic of Howard Hughes, including an incident where Hughes crashes while flying an airplane.
 Bounce (2000): a commercial flight crashes after one character had given his ticket on that flight to another, leading the surviving character to feel guilt over the death of the person to whom he had given his ticket.
 Cast Away (2000): a plane crash leaves the protagonist, played by Tom Hanks, stranded on a Pacific island.
 Con Air (1997): in the films's climactic crash scene, a C-123 where much of the action takes place crashes on the Las Vegas strip. Of three C-123s used in the production of the film, one was non-airworthy and in poor condition, was dismantled and its fuselage was used for filming the crash scene. Maxim put the film at the top of their 2007 list of "The Top Ten Most Horrific Movie Plane Crashes", a decision that was derided by Wired.
 Die Hard 2 (1990): a Douglas DC-8 is given false landing instructions by terrorists and crash lands in a blizzard, resulting in fatalities to all on board; a later scene has an airplane carrying the villains being blown up by protagonist John McClane (Bruce Willis).
 Fearless (1993): Jeff Bridges stars as the survivor of an airplane crash whose perspective on life is changed by his surviving unharmed while others perished.
 Fight Club (1999): A mid-air collision occurs in the imagination of the protagonist.
 Final Destination (2000): A plane breaks apart and explodes in flight at the beginning of the film; passengers who escaped death by leaving the plane prior to takeoff due to a premonition are then stalked by death. A 2011 sequel, Final Destination 5, ends with the same plane crash that began the first film in the series.
 Flight (2012): a commercial flight crashes due to a technical malfunction, and the pilot, played by Denzel Washington, must invert the airplane in order to control the crash.
 The Flight of the Phoenix (1965): drawn from a 1964 novel by Elleston Trevor of the same title, the crash of a Fairchild C-82 Packet in the North African desert as central to the plot.
 The Grey (2010): An airplane crash in the wilderness pits crash survivors against the elements.
 The High and the Mighty (1954): John Wayne stars as a veteran airline first officer flying as a passenger on an airplane that has a catastrophic engine failure while crossing the Pacific Ocean, and who must help fly the plane to a safe landing.
 Knowing (2009): Nicolas Cage plays MIT astrophysics professor John Koestler, who discovers a record of future disasters, including a plane crash; he visits the site in advance of the crash, which happens in front of him.
 The Mountain Between Us (2017): A small plane crash in remote mountains leaves two survivors to navigate rugged terrain and fend off natural dangers in able to reach safety.
 Sully (2016): directed by Clint Eastwood and starring Tom Hanks as Sully Sullenberger, recreates the events around Sullenberger's Hudson River landing.
 U.S. Marshals (1998): depicts the crash of a 727 from the Justice Prisoner and Alien Transportation System (JPATS).
 United 93 (2006): directed by Paul Greengrass, the film is a "forensic account of the 9/11 flight whose passengers resisted the hijackers", though the actual crash is not depicted, as the film "cuts to black as the plane starts to dive".
 Wild Tales (2014): Argentine anthology comedy with the first segment revolving around "a pilot gathering his unwitting enemies on a revenge flight"; at the end of the segment, the pilot crashes the plane into the house of his parents.

Television
Criminal Minds season 10 episode "A Thousand Suns", aired October 15, 2014: the investigation of a commercial airline crash reveals that it was caused by a disgruntled engineer who had found a way to remotely override airplane control systems.
Elementary season 1 episode "Flight Risk", aired November 8, 2012: a small plane crash turns out to be a cover-up for a murder. Holmes deduces that one of the four victims was murdered beforehand by the lack of bleeding. He concludes that sand was put into the fuel tank to disable the plane's engine and surmises the murder victim walked in on the perpetrator at work. His corpse was then stuffed in the cargo hold, which caused a weight imbalance and the subsequent premature crash, on land instead of water.
Grey's Anatomy episodes "Flight, aired May 17, 2012, and "One Flight Down", aired April 16, 2015: in the first episode, many of the main characters are injured in a small plane crash in a forest in the state of Washington, and they must struggle to survive the ordeal; in the second, the characters must deal with patients arriving at their hospital from a commercial airplane crash in Seattle.
Lost, from the pilot episode aired September 22, 2004: deals with the crash of a commercial plane from the fictional Oceanic Airlines. This theme was inspired by the film Cast Away.
Quincy, M.E. season 6 episode "Scream to the Skies", aired February 11, 1981: the crash of Boeing 747 spurs Dr. Quincy's subsequent efforts to improve airline safety regulations.
The Six Million Dollar Man pilot episode "The Moon and the Desert", aired March 7, 1973: Lee Majors, as Steve Austin, is the pilot in the crash of a Northrop M2-F2 NASA research aircraft during a test flight; Austin is severely injured and must be given bionic parts to save his life. The footage used was from a real M2-F2 accident that took place on 10 May 1967 in the California desert.

Other media
 Music video for the Katy Perry song "Roar", released on September 5, 2013: the crash of a small plane has left the protagonist stranded in the jungle, where she discovers her confidence and asserts control over the animals, while still using the crashed airplane fuselage as her home.
 Charlie Victor Romeo (1999), a play in which performers dramatically reenact FAA transcripts of crew communications during six airplane crashes.
The survival video game The Forest (2018) features a plane crash that brings the protagonist Eric LeBlanc and his son Timmy, to the peninsula; immediately after the plane crashes, the players must scavange the wreckage for materials with which to survive. It is later shown that the villain of the game caused the crash, and that the protagonist has the choice of causing another plane to crash in the peninsula in order to bring his son back to life with a required child sacrifice.

See also
Aircraft in fiction
:Category:Aviation accidents and incidents in fiction

References

Aviation accidents and incidents in fiction
Airplane crashes
Fictional